KLUU (103.5 MHz) is an FM radio station licensed to Wahiawa, Hawaii, and serving the Honolulu metropolitan area.  It broadcasts a Contemporary Christian radio format.  It is owned by the Educational Media Foundation and carries the K-Love Network.

KLUU has an effective radiated power (ERP) of 100,000 watts (horizontal polarization) and 86,490 watts (vertical polarization).^  It may be operating on an auxiliary power of 85,000 watts ERP.  The transmitter is off Palehua Road, amid the towers for other Honolulu-area FM and TV stations.  It also operates FM translator stations on 104.7 in Haleiwa and 105.5 in Honolulu.

History
Under Kona Coast Radio, KLUU applied for a construction permit as KKHI in February 2005 (superseded by a September transaction that same year), and became a variety station owned by Vic Michael of Kona Coast which officially signed on in 2007.

In October 2005, the call sign changed from KKHI to KHAI. In March 2007, Kona Coast sold KHAI to the Educational Media Foundation, which began running its Air1 service, which eventually was switched over to K-love. KHAI obtained the present KLUU callsign from K-love's Jamestown, North Dakota affiliate KJKL in 2015.

Subchannels
KLUU broadcasts using HD Radio technology.

On its HD2 digital subchannel, it carries Air 1, a sister station to K-love, relayed on an FM translator on 105.5 MHz.
On the HD3 subchannel, KLUU runs K-Love Classics, a Christian music network that covers the 1980s through the early 2000s.

Translators
KLUU programming is also carried on a broadcast translator station to extend or improve the coverage area of the station.

Notes

References

External links
klove.com

LUU
LUU
K-Love radio stations
Radio stations established in 2007
2007 establishments in Hawaii
Educational Media Foundation radio stations